Arachnogyaritus is a genus of beetles in the family Cerambycidae.

Species
 Arachnogyaritus celestini Gouverneur & Vitali, 2016
 Arachnogyaritus saleuii Gouverneur & Vitali, 2016

References

Gyaritini